The Hood (Parker Robbins) is a supervillain appearing in American comic books published by Marvel Comics. Created by writer Brian K. Vaughan, and artists Kyle Hotz and Eric Powell, the character was introduced in his own self-titled limited series, which started with Hood #1 (July 2002). Robbins was originally a petty criminal, until an encounter with a Nisanti demon, which he defeated and robbed of its hood and boots, gaining superpowers in the process, such as levitation and invisibility. As "the Hood", he became a well-known figure in the New York City criminal underworld, and eventually formed his own crime syndicate.

Anthony Ramos is set to portray Robbins in the Marvel Cinematic Universe Disney+ series Ironheart (2023).

Publication history
Created by writer Brian K. Vaughan and artists Kyle Hotz and Eric Powell, the Hood first appeared in his own self-titled MAX limited series in 2002, which featured his origin, as a character who possesses a cloak and boots stolen from a Nisanti demon, which grant him invisibility and limited levitation ability, respectively.

The Hood next appeared in the 2006 miniseries Beyond!, a miniseries set in outer space, which had the character shift towards a slightly more anti-heroic position, as opposed to a villainous one.

Brian Michael Bendis stated in a 2007 Newsarama interview that within the pages of New Avengers, Parker Robbins would be getting similar treatment to Vito Corleone in The Godfather Part II. Bendis says that "... like the Sentry and Echo—the Hood is one of these excellent brand new creations that no one else was touching, and that's how they fall by the wayside."

Confirming the statement and having Parker return to his villainous roots, a 2007 New Avengers storyline had Parker rise to becoming "the 'Godfather' of all supervillains", mostly due to the fact that Marvel's Civil War event prevented any heroes from stopping him. Although the New Avengers defeated the Hood's new gang of supercriminals, he broke them out, only to be defeated once more.

Following 2008's Secret Invasion, The Hood has a more prominent role, as part of the Cabal, and features in his own tie-in limited series, Dark Reign: The Hood, written by Jeff Parker.

Since Bendis gained control of the character, he has not appeared with his boots, and the Nisanti demon; a tie-in to Vaughn's Runaways series, was revealed to be a disguise for the Doctor Strange nemesis, Dormammu.

Fictional character biography

Origin
Parker Robbins' father worked closely with the Kingpin and had a healthy relationship with his son as he was growing up. As a child, Parker witnessed a battle between Daredevil and Electro, which would have a profound effect on his young adulthood. After his father's death, Parker's mother entered a near-vegetative state and was hospitalized. Deeply troubled, Parker soon turned to a life of crime, and would lie to his mother about the jobs he had found during his visits. Parker's well-meaning nature was juxtaposed with his philandering and thieving ways, such as taking care of his pregnant girlfriend Sara, while visiting a prostitute on the side.

One night, Parker's cousin and best friend John King, a recovering alcoholic and thief, tells him about a job at a warehouse said to be housing valuable goods. Taking the job, Parker accompanies John to the warehouse, where they stumble upon an abandoned mystic ritual, resulting in an encounter with a Nisanti demon. Parker shoots the demon, seemingly killing it, and steals its hood and boots, not wanting to leave empty-handed. After tossing his gun in a dumpster, Parker encounters a gang who want the boots he had stolen off a HYDRA agent before going to the warehouse. Throwing the boots at the gang, he flees and puts on the demon's boots, learning of their levitation powers.

Parker later shares his discovery with John and decides to try on the cloak as well, discovering it allows him to become invisible while holding his breath. After using his newfound powers to commit petty robberies, Parker agrees to help John steal a shipment of blood diamonds. The diamonds belong to crime boss Dennis Golembuski (aka Golem), who hired Constrictor, Jack O'Lantern, Shocker, and Madame Rapier to guard them. However, Parker overpowers them and steals half of the shipment. After meeting up with John, the pair are confronted by two police officers. Parker shoots one officer and John knocks the other out with a blow to the back of the head. The officer shot by Robbins later collapses into a coma, and eventually dies. While John stays behind to take the blame, Parker flees, and is dubbed "the Hood" by the authorities while a bounty is placed on his head.

Pursued by the Golem, the cops, and two FBI agents, the Hood hatches a plan to break John out of prison. He tries to pawn the diamonds for John's lawyer fee, but runs into the Shocker. After defeating him, he finds out about Golem and Rapier, and says he will give the diamonds back in exchange for a returner's fee. Golem agrees and sends Rapier with the Hood under secret instructions to kill Parker after the deal was made. Knowing it to be a setup, however, the Hood purchases a similar cloak, and gives it to Rapier at the time she is confronted by the FBI, resulting in her being mistaken for the Hood and shot dead. He then gives the diamonds to the still-living enforcers to deliver to Golem, believing this will end the conflict between them, and also tells them to inform their employer of the consequences of messing with him. Meanwhile, believing the Hood has been killed, the FBI closes the case, and releases John after he testifies in court.

Parker later visits his mother and tells her that he will begin helping people and making her proud. Elsewhere, the Golem receives the diamonds and the Hood's message, and he vows that nothing was ended between them. The wife of the cop shot by the Hood, who has died in a coma, vows to avenge him as White Fang, as she does not believe the Hood is dead. The Nisanti demon is also shown to have been resurrected, thanks to John shouting out its name during the robbery attempt, and prepares to track the Hood down.

Beyond!
Alongside Spider-Man, Venom, Gravity, Medusa, Hank Pym, the Wasp, Kraven the Hunter, and Firebird, the Hood finds himself transported to the reconstructed Battleworld. While in transit, they are told that one victor will have a wish granted by the Beyonder, should the other combatants die. The Hood attempts to capitalize on this by using his invisibility to launch a sneak attack on the gathered heroes and villains, but is battered by Kraven, using his enhanced sense of smell. During the confusion of the Hood's attack, Venom manages to impale Spider-Man through the chest.

Crashlanding on Battleworld and losing Spider-Man's body, the group encounters Deathlok, who assists them in battle against Dragon Man. After the battle, the Hood follows Kraven as the latter encounters Spider-Man, who has a gaping chest wound but is still alive. After Kraven leaves, the Hood then reveals himself and shoots Spider-Man in the knees.

The Hood takes Spider-Man to the camp and forces him to reveal himself as the original Space Phantom. After battling the Space Phantom, the Hood accompanies the group into Limbo to wait for the Space Phantom to appear when he chooses his next target for impersonation. In Limbo, Venom destroys the portal on Battleworld, claiming victory, and the Hood and Gravity bond.

Using the Space Phantom to return to Battleworld, the group confronts Venom and realizes that Uatu the Watcher is there. Pym shoots the group, seemingly killing them all, to draw out the Beyonder. In truth, this is the Stranger, who is fooled by Pym shrinking the entire group down. The Hood then attacks the Stranger alongside the other combatants, before the Stranger leaves.

With Battleworld crumbling since the Stranger's will is no longer holding it together, the Hood and the others escape, but not before Gravity sacrifices his life to save the group. While on Earth, he attends Gravity's funeral with Sara. Some time after this, Sara gives birth to his child. Gravity is returned to life a short time later.

Hood's criminal empire

The Hood begins his quest to become the Kingpin of all supervillains in New York by inviting a large contingent of villains to a meeting where he gives each of them $25,000 of seed money, partly to gain their confidence, and partly to buy their loyalty. He promises them much more where that came from if they join him in creating a new criminal empire with Robbins at the head and John King as his lieutenant. Parker uses the cloak, but his boots are not used in the arc.

The Hood's gang includes Jigsaw, who had been attacked and beaten by Tigra in an earlier robbery. To prove himself to the gathered supervillains, the Hood seeks out and viciously beats Tigra, threatening her mother's life as a warning, while Jigsaw films the attack.

At the after party, Chemistro informs the Hood of a plot by the Owl to sell Deathlok, which he stole from S.H.I.E.L.D., to the highest bidder. As the Owl has not gained permission from his new crime syndicate, The Hood decides to gatecrash the auction. He effortlessly ambushes and dispatches the Owl by sending Madame Masque, the Crimson Cowl, the Wizard, and Doctor Jonas Harrow as proxies.

John King and the Hood reconvene in the back room of a rundown bar, where they are confronted by a curious Wolverine, who overhears their plans to run Deathlok through the lobby of Avengers Tower. Covering King's retreat, the Hood manages to shoot Wolverine in the crotch before assuming the form of the Nisanti demon who originally owned his gear, enabling him to overpower the mutant and escape.

Chemistro suggests that they change their plan and instead use Deathlok to rob a federal reserve bank in New Jersey, seeing it as a more profitable venture than a suicidal attack on Avengers Tower. The robbery is successful, netting them over $12.7 million (US), although Deathlok is destroyed in the process. As the group celebrates their victory, Luke Cage smashes through the wall of their base closely followed by nearly the entire population of the New York superhero community including the New Avengers, the Mighty Avengers, the Fantastic Four (including Storm and the Black Panther), Howard the Duck, Punisher, the Defenders, Silver Surfer, and Thor. These superheroes turn out to be illusions, however, as only the New Avengers are actually present. In the ensuing battle, Doctor Strange appears to banish Robbins using an anti-demon spell, while the rest of the syndicate is taken down.

The Hood appears alongside Turk Barrett. He surveys a fight between Daredevil and a gang of street thugs, after Turk double crosses Mister Fear to show his allegiance to the Hood's new crime empire. The Hood is then mentioned by name when the Enforcers, who are working for Mister Fear, are ambushed by Wrecker and Razor Fist who are working for the Hood.

Later, after some of Robbins' syndicates are captured by S.H.I.E.L.D., Robbins reappears and frees them. He leads Wrecker and others on a rampage through the Raft, swearing to take revenge on the New Avengers. After interrogating Tigra to learn their location, the Hood leads his syndicate against the New Avengers, using the magical powers of his hood and cloak to see through the illusions defending the Sanctum Sanctorum. In the ensuing battle, the Hood fatally injures Doctor Strange before being pushed aside by Wong, and nearly blows Iron Fist's head off before being intercepted by a vengeful Tigra. The Hood, alongside both the New Avengers and his syndicate, is taken down by Doctor Strange's paralyzing spell, but manages to escape from the arriving S.H.I.E.L.D. agents. In the aftermath, Robbins is seen talking to an unseen figure, exclaiming, "Now I know how to beat 'em."

Secret Invasion
During several flashbacks in the Secret Invasion storyline, it is revealed that Skrulls have been trying to infiltrate the Hood's organization. Skrulls disguised as S.H.I.E.L.D. agents try to replace Madame Masque, but the Hood rescues her. During the interrogation of the surviving Skrull, Doctor Demonicus convinces the Hood to use his power to scan the surrounding villains. It is discovered that the Slug is a Skrull in disguise. The Hood shoots and kills him with the other villains wondering how long that Skrull was impersonating Slug. Later by himself, the Hood discovers that his power comes from the mystical entity Dormammu.

The Hood is seen watching live coverage of the Skrull Invasion on television in Brooklyn with Wizard, Madame Masque, the Blood Brothers, John King, and Bulldozer. He decides to gather everyone to fight the Skrulls, despite Chemistro's objections that they should, "let the heroes and aliens kill each other". Despite protests, the Hood reasons that if the Skrulls were to destroy the world as they know it, that it would be bad for business. He then instructs Wizard, Madame Masque, the Blood Brothers, John King, and Bulldozer to gather everyone for the attack. The Hood's group joins with a loose collection of super-powered heroes in the middle of Central Park with the assistance of Electro, Lightmaster, Masked Marauder, and Scorcher. As one, they attack a Skrull force. When the battle is over, the villains all return to hiding. The Hood is later seen meeting with Namor, Doctor Doom, Emma Frost, Loki, and Norman Osborn.

Dark Reign
Following the events of the Secret Invasion, the group's first meeting is shown at the start of the Dark Reign storyline. Norman Osborn talks to Namor, Emma Frost, Doctor Doom, Loki, and the Hood about his plans for the new world order. When the Hood enters, Emma reads his mind only to make him angry. He threatens her with a gun telling her to stay out of his head, and that she does not know who she is messing with. In response, Emma telepathically forces him to put his own gun in his mouth, much to the amusement of Namor. Osborn offers the cabal solidarity and the resources to accomplish their own agendas. In return, Osborn asks for their public support/registration, as well as cooperation fulfilling any request he may have of them.

To prevent the New Avengers from ambushing the Dark Avengers, Norman Osborn gives orders to the Hood to have his crime syndicate keep the New Avengers away. While Scarecrow is shown taking a hit from the second Captain America's shield, Ms. Marvel channels Spider-Woman's powers to stun the villains, allowing the New Avengers to escape.

After Punisher tries to assassinate Osborn (failing due to the intervention of Sentry), Osborn asks the Hood to hunt him down. The Hood sends Grizzly to take down Punisher. After Grizzly is defeated, the Hood forces a somehow-revived Microchip to help kill Punisher. The Hood uses the powers of Dormammu to resurrect the villains that were killed by Scourge of the Underworld (Basilisk, Bird-Man, Black Abbot, Blue Streak, Cheetah, Cyclone, Death Adder, Firebrand, Hijacker, Human Fly, Letha, Megatak, Mind-Wave, Miracle Man, Mirage, Titania, Turner D. Century, and Wraith) to form a squad that will help him take down the Punisher. The Hood then explains to the resurrected villains how much has happened since their deaths at the hands of Scourge of the Underworld. He tells them that the Punisher acted as the Scourge and that they must take the opportunity to kill the Punisher as the Deadly Dozen before the spell that has revived them wears off. Hood then has Death Adder and Basilisk capture G.W. Bridge's family and hold them hostage so that G.W. can tell them where Punisher is. When on a scouting mission on behalf of the Hood, Wraith is shot with an arrow launched by the Punisher. Upon encountering illusions of his dead family, Punisher encounters the Hood, who says that he will revive his family in exchange for his surrender. Punisher declines and escapes from the Hood. During Punisher's fight with Human Fly, Avengers from out of place and out of time appear and prevent Punisher from killing Human Fly, who is retrieved by Bird-Man. After evading the Avengers, Punisher fights them again and discovers that Captain America is actually Mirage in disguise, while Mind-Wave is revealed to have been impersonating Iron Man. Cheetah (when posing as Beast) is killed in the fight. Mind-Wave dies when a nearby grenade explodes. Norman Osborn later scolds the Hood for having the revived villains pose as the Avengers in their fight against Punisher. Hood tells Norman not to call him up screaming again. Upon learning that Cyclone and Miracle Man bailed, Letha has Microchip warn them that if they do not return, their living loved ones will be killed by her. While Lascivious and Letha accompany Human Fly to attack the Punisher, Microchip sends Megatak to attack Punisher's hacker ally Henry. While Hood has the caskets of Punisher's family dug up, Hijacker chases the Punisher in his tank. Punisher then uses Pym particles to shrink down and get into the tank. After taking control of the tank, Punisher crashes it into the building where Basilisk is holding G.W. Bridge, and uses the gases on Basilisk. The Hood manages to orchestrate Punisher's capture and brings him to where he is reviving his family. To begin the ritual, Hood has Microchip shoot G.W. Bridge in the head. The Punisher refuses to accept this, and forces Firebrand to burn them alive. Punisher then shoots Firebrand in the back of the head.

The Hood also learns from Black Talon of the zombie virus, and tries to gain it for himself. Dormammu appears, through their link, to acknowledge this. Dormammu, though knowing of its lethal nature consuming entire universes and the near-certainty that it would be "bad for business", insists that Parker use it to ravage the planet for him to ascend there, apparently not concerned about the infection for himself (possibly due to his form being composed of pure Faltinian energy and his considerable magical prowess). Despite his advisor's complaints that the virus is far too dangerous, the Hood and his underlings, the Night Shift, meet with Black Talon on the Caribbean island Taino to obtain the zombie Deadpool's head, only to see the situation quickly spiral out of control as the zombie virus becomes airborne and infects the entire island. Seemingly abandoned by Dormammu and now fearful of the zombies, the Hood is captured by and soon allies himself with the Midnight Sons (who have been sent by A.R.M.O.R. to contain the virus) to escape the island. After watching Man-Thing seemingly die by zombie Deadpool and the Midnight Sons member Werewolf by Night's zombification, the Hood, Morbius, and Daimon Hellstrom are confronted by a zombified and hungry Night Shift. As Morbius is about to call in a nuclear strike, Jennifer Kale reappears, empowered by Dormammu, though his power is soon exorcised from her. Kale and Black Talon then confine the zombie virus inside the Zombie. His powers returned, the Hood teleports away with the cured, but still undead-esque, Night Shift.

Norman Osborn later hires the Hood to help Taskmaster in running Camp H.A.M.M.E.R. so that Norman Osborn can train the Dark Avengers of tomorrow. The Hood later kills Vampiro, who has failed to be subtle in a double murder upon some prostitutes he picked up at a truck stop. The Hood assists Norman Osborn in capturing Night Thrasher, and makes him a deal which involves resurrecting his brother Dwayne Taylor. When Nightmare takes over Trauma's body, the Hood gets affected by Trauma's powers, seeing himself killing Sara and his daughter Bree. After Nightmare is driven from Trauma's body, the Hood ends up dismissing Penance and Trauma from the Initiative.

Hood later had his encounter with Enforcer II who triggered an amulet that disguised a creature that fed off of demonic energies which then clasps onto Hood's face. Enforcer II managed to escape as Hood swears revenge.

Hood later marks Babu Marzouk with the help of Madame Masque. He materialized to save his criminal allies by shooting the armed guards dead. Dormammu then taunted Hood by speaking through the corpses. Hood later told his supervillain group what he wanted and then went to bed with Madame Masque. Following his visit to his girlfriend Sara's house, Hood was then attacked by White Fang. White Fang nearly pounded Hood to death until Dormammu took over and nearly killed White Fang. Hood retreated back to his hideout and told John King what had happened. Hood later went with his mother to see Sara where he meets Satana. While the Hood is meeting with Satana to learn more about Dormammu and the Nisanti, he learned that Dormammu had targeted him from the start. John King, Griffin, Piledriver, and Scorcher are caught at the bar by Force and the NYPD. The Hood uses his connections with Norman Osborn to get the villains "transferred" from prison. Controller secretly gives White Fang a new suit to use in her next fight with the Hood. Hood later took Sara and Bree to a safehouse that he bought before heading off to talk to Satana some more. Hood later gave Controller some technology before going to meet up with his gang. When his Crime Syndicate prepares to rob a ship, Squid and Man-Fish head into the water to secure it for them. While his Crime Syndicate is fighting Force and the NYPD, Hood is then attacked by White Fang. Following a fight with White Fang, John King told Hood that Controller was sowing discord amongst his Crime Syndicate. Dormammu later possesses Hood's baby daughter and taunts Hood. During the fight against Force and White Fang, Controller sets Hood's cloak on fire to keep him from calling Dormammu. Dormammu's powers then flooded Hood who then pushes Controller aside, defeats Force, and makes White Fang renounce her vendetta against him. Satana later speaks with Hood and informs him that Dormammu is already bound to him and that the cloak is now a token.

The Hood later starts a gang war with Mister Negative after he corrupts White Dragon (who has been sent to gather information about Mister Negative's group) causing the Hood to kill White Dragon II. A flashback has led to Mister Negative corrupting White Dragon II and leading the attack upon the Hood's headquarters. The Hood's Crime Syndicate ends up fighting Spider-Man (who has been corrupted by Mister Negative) and Mister Negative's henchmen. After Spider-Man's attack on his headquarters, the Hood confronts Mister Negative in his Chinatown headquarters. Mister Negative tries to corrupt the Hood to his side, but fails. Though he gains the upper hand, Negative escapes and the Hood is forced to fall back when Osborn drops H.A.M.M.E.R.'s seal of Chinatown and threatens to send in his Avengers. The Hood is currently unaware that Spot is a mole in his syndicate for Mister Negative.

Dormammu empowers the Hood with enough magic to find and kill Doctor Strange, so that Parker can become the new Sorcerer Supreme. The Hood approaches Strange, while he is talking to Wiccan of the Young Avengers. As they fight, Strange tells the Hood that Dormammu's promises are empty, as are all other demons, but Parker ignores him and attacks them both. After Wiccan intervenes, Strange and Billy get away and Parker goes home. While there, he has a breakdown and tries to rip off his cloak but finds he cannot. Madame Masque appears, wanting to know what is going on. Madame Masque promises to help him, removes her mask, and they kiss. Unknown to them, Dormammu watches from a mirror. Later on, Parker goes and attacks Daimon Hellstrom, the Son of Satan. He later fights Doctor Strange and the New Avengers until Brother Voodoo (who has become the new Sorcerer Supreme) arrives. Dormammu then manifests through Parker, but is exorcised. Parker is left badly burned and stripped of his hood. In a hospital, Loki approaches him offering him a second chance, which he accepts.

Loki then takes him and Madame Masque to Cuba and presents the Norn Stones to him, which brings back his powers. The Hood and Madame Masque return and learn from John King that Doctor Jonas Harrow and the rest of the gang have found about his deal with Norman Osborn and made their own. Already, the Hood finds out that his gang has surrendered themselves to Osborn. Hood and Madame Masque make a call to Norman Osborn, who asks why Hood did not keep his gang in line. Hood responds by telling Norman Osborn that Loki is helping him regain his powers, and asks what to do about Jonas Harrow. Some minutes later on the Helicarrier, the Hood's gang is waiting for Harrow to arrive. The reason why is for the Hood to blast off his head. He then berates his gang for spurning his generosity. The Wrecker snaps back by telling the Hood that he did not tell them that they were working for Osborn. The Hood corrects him that he did not want his gang to be under Norman Osborn's thumb, so they are in fact his freelance agents. Now, they have to work with Norman Osborn and do what he says. They have to kill everyone who was involved in Luke Cage's escape including the New Avengers. However, Norman Osborn wants Spider-Man alive.

Siege
The Hood is present at the Cabal when Norman Osborn assembles them to discuss Asgard. Upon Doctor Doom's demanding that Norman brings Namor to him, Norman Osborn has Doctor Doom attacked by an unknown assailant. After the attack, Osborn examines the body to see that it is not Doom, but a small swarm of robotic insects inside a Doombot. The insects attack the Cabal. Under the suggestion of Loki, the Hood flees from the attack.

The Hood reveals the Norn Stones to his Crime Syndicate and states that it can empower them with the ability to find the New Avengers and those responsible for helping Luke Cage escape. In Brooklyn, Steve Rogers and Bucky see the wreckage of their comprised safe house. Then, suddenly, they are attacked by an Asgardian magic-enhanced Living Laser. This is noticed by the H.A.M.M.E.R. ground forces nearby. Steve Rogers quickly moves to take down the soldiers, leaving Bucky to deal with the Laser. He uses the shield to slice off his head, only to be caught by the Corruptor, who uses his chemicals to take Bucky under his control. Meanwhile, in Manhattan, Spider-Man and Spider-Woman are hanging on the side of a building, seeing Avengers Tower on high alert. They discuss Spider-Man's history with Osborn. In truth, Spider-Man confesses that he is more mad that Osborn has weaseled his way into power. He swears that when Osborn screws up and everyone sees the maniac that he is, he will web his face to the floor. Their conversation is interrupted when Spider-Man notices Spider-Woman's alien detector watch, given to her by S.W.O.R.D., to detect if he is a Skrull. Back at the ruined safe house, Rogers infiltrates his former home, to find his energy shield. He uses it just in time, as mind-controlled Bucky attempts to shoot him. Perched on another building are the Griffin and Mandrill. The former confesses that he does not want to go bounty hunting for Avengers but fears getting a bounty on his head. Just then, Mandrill sees both Spider-Man and Spider-Woman. Their attack sets off the former's spider-sense. Living Laser finds Corruptor and demands that they finish off the heroes but the latter refuses to do so, until his puppet kills Rogers. Rogers himself urges his own friend to fight the chemicals. Unfortunately, Bucky cannot do it. Luckily, the bullet bounces off their shield before ricocheting off a bulkhead right into Corruptor's device, freeing Bucky from his control. Angry, Living Laser prepares for his attack. Back in Manhattan, Spider-Man is being thrown around by Griffin, before being blasted right into the traffic below. Spider-Woman is affected by Mandrill's pheromones, who plans on extracting the New Avengers' location out of her before forcing her to kill herself.

When visiting his brother's grave, Donyell is conflicted if he should go with the deal Norman Osborn and the Hood gave him. Counter Force takes the fight to Camp H.A.M.M.E.R. and ends up fighting the Hood's gang. They are knocked down by the Hood's new Asgardian weaponry. When Donyell arrives, the Hood gives him an opportunity to prove himself by killing Tigra. The Hood demands that Donyell kill Tigra if he wants his brother revived. Instead, Donyell attacks the Hood and is joined by Tigra as the Hood uses the Norn Stones to empower some of the cadets on his side. Robbie Baldwin evades the guards and manages to get Batwing, Bengal, and Butterball to help the Avengers Resistance as he also reveals his identity. The Hood receives a call from Norman Osborn requesting his assistance in Asgard, so he leaves in a portal while the other villains continue fighting. As the Hood arrives in Asgard, Taskmaster fights Captain America and is taken down.

Spider-Man manages to free Spider-Woman from Mandrill's control and they defeat Mandrill and Griffin. Meanwhile, Luke Cage assists Steve Rogers and Captain America in fighting off Living Laser. Nick Fury and his Secret Warriors arrive and fend off the H.A.M.M.E.R. Agents. Upon seeing Norman Osborn's attack on Asgard, Steve Rogers has the Avengers assemble to fight the Dark Avengers and those that are on Norman Osborn's side.

The Hood and his gang catch up with the New Avengers at Asgard and try to stop them. The Hood later tries to attack Balder thinking him to be an easy target, only for Balder to deflect it with his sword. Loki ends up taking back the Norn Stones from the Hood to empower the New Avengers, Young Avengers, and Secret Warriors with the power to defeat the Sentry (who is fully possessed by the Void). While the Dark Avengers and those that assisted them are being arrested, the Hood manages to get away with Madame Masque's help. The Hood is pessimistic, knowing that his gang would simply sell him out. However, Madame Masque refuses to let him go down. This causes Madame Masque to seek out her father Count Nefaria to help the Hood. The New Avengers capture John King, and use him to track the Hood and Madame Masque, and after a battle with Nefaria they capture the villains and bring all four of them to Maria Hill to place them under arrest.

The Hood is later seen being held in a classified superhuman holding facility being attacked by Tigra. Tigra leaves Robbins, stating that she has changed her mind about how to punish him when she sees something in the hallway. Tigra exits the room and allows Robbins' wife and baby to enter.

Heroic Age
At some point in time, Robbins escapes jail, and at the same time, has someone replace him in his cell, who has had plastic surgery to resemble him. Staying with his cousin, he is attacked by Striker, Hazmat and Veil from Avengers Academy, in response to the tape of Hood's assault on Tigra being leaked online. This, along with other personal factors, gives him the desire to regain his power, and kill every one of the Avengers, no matter what team they are on. While in Ryker's Island, Hood befriended an Inhuman named Ertzia and learns the location of one of the Infinity Gems. Once out Parker Robbins hires several people to take him to the former location of the Inhuman secret city, Attilan. After eliminating them, he locates the Reality Gem. Some time before, the six Illuminati locate the Gems and each member takes possession of one to make sure they would never again fall into the wrong hands. But Black Bolt is dead, and the royal family did not know about the gem he had hidden when they moved the Inhumans off of Earth, thus it was left unguarded. Using the Reality Gem, the Hood swiftly uses it to steal the Power Gem from Reed Richards. His quest next takes him into conflict with the Red Hulk and the Avengers. Hood later targets the other Illuminati members for the other Infinity Gems. At a later point in time, Robbins uses the Reality Gem to heal Madame Masque's face.

The Hood uses the red (Power) and yellow (Reality) gems to steal the purple (Space) gem from Iron Man, using it to teleport the Avengers away to an unknown location, where upon entry, he is faced with Thor and Red Hulk, Thor having the Orange (Time) Gem. During the conflict, Red Hulk manages to steal the Power Gem from Hood. As Uatu watches on, Thor implores Hood to surrender, lest he kill himself. Hood declines the offer, and teleports to the ruins of Xavier Mansion, where Xavier is leading a team of Avengers against the Danger Room to try to secure the Mind Gem. Effortlessly, Hood gets the Gem and engages in a mental battle with Xavier, emerging triumphant. He then warps to the Astral Plane to get the Soul Gem, but is confronted by its wielder Thanos. In reality, Thanos was one of Strange's illusions. When that did not work, Red Hulk, in possession of the Power Gem, punched Hood, and Hood wished Iron Man out of existence. Whilst this happened, Iron Man later reappeared with the Infinity Gauntlet, calling the Reality Gem to come to the Gauntlet. While the Hood protested that he had done nothing that the other superhumans present would not do if they had lost their powers, Iron Man and the other heroes simply rejected his words, using the Infinity Gauntlet to send Hood back to jail.

The Illuminati
As part of the All-New, All-Different Marvel event, Hood forms another group to help him achieve his goals for power. He set up numerous villains to make them join his Illuminati with the purpose to be in the "big leagues" of super villains and ultimately control the world order. For the Illuminati, he gathered a rebuilt Black Ant (a Life Model Decoy of Eric O'Grady created by Father), Enchantress, Mad Thinker, Thunderball, and Titania.

During the Avengers: Standoff! storyline, Hood and Titania infiltrate Pleasant Hill when Baron Helmut Zemo and Fixer restore the memories of the inmates there, and recruit Absorbing Man and Whirlwind. When Hood draws up plans to target the families of their enemies, a disgusted Titania challenges his authority and destroys his cloak during the resulting battle.

Kingpin War
Hood later finds another set of Norn Stones and renews his plans to become the Kingpin of Crime after Wilson Fisk went straight. While competing against Diamondback and Black Cat, Hood begins his first move by using the Norn Stones to revive Hammerhead after he was killed by Diamondback's men. When Diamondback was defeated by the Defenders, Hood took over his areas and plans to get his gang back together. Though the Defenders defeated Hood with help from the other superheroes, Hood escaped.

During the "Search for Tony Stark" arc, Hood managed to get his gang back together with Answer, Armadillo, Brothers Grimm, Centurius, Corruptor, Cutthroat, Crossfire, Deathwatch, Jigsaw, Living Laser, Razor Fist, Slug, Vermin, the Wrecking Crew, and the son of Constrictor. Their first mission was to deal with Doctor Doom who had gone straight. As the Wrecking Crew fight through all the Doombots in Castle Doom enough to attract Doctor Doom in his Iron Man armor, Wrecker gets the drop on him. After Doctor Doom defeats Wrecker and Thunderball, Hood arrives with his gang and knocks him off balance with his bullets. With Doctor Doom defeated on the ground, Hood instructs his gang to search all of Castle Doom to find his secrets. With Doctor Doom lying on the ground, Rampage and Shockwave remove his cape and hold him by the arms. As Wrecker works to break open the armor, Hood tries to get answers out of Doctor Doom about his connections with Tony Stark. By the time Wrecker opens the armor, Victor von Doom disappears in a bright light. Hood suspects that Doctor Doom and Tony Stark are connected and plans to get Doctor Doom's wealth by looking for Tony Stark. While thinking that Victor von Doom has a connection with Tony Stark, Hood approaches Stark Industries' acting C.C.O. Eric Lynch. Knowing that Lynch wants to take over the company and considering himself a mercenary, Hood states that they are going to be good friends. Hood works to coerce Lynch into handing him his part of Stark Industries. Before that can happen, Iron Man, Victor von Doom, a rebooted War Machine, and a battalion of Doombots arrive where they attack Hood and his gang. During Hood's fight with Doctor Doom, the unidentified demon that Hood is associated with threatens retaliation if Hood is damaged. The demon uses Hood to grab Victor's exposed face and burns it.

Modern adventures
After a failed attempt at blackmailing Greg "Foolkiller" Salinger as part of a larger plan to reestablish his criminal empire, Hood is assumed to be killed by Punisher.

The Hood reappears in the series Hawkeye: Freefall negating his previously assumed death at the hands of the Punisher. He is shown to be aided by lesser thugs and fights Hawkeye.

During the "Beyond" storyline, Hood was looking to rebuild his empire yet again. To do that, he needs something that was taken from him during 'Hawkeye: Freefall'. He plans to extort the Black Cat and resume his criminal machinations.

Powers and abilities

Current facilities
The Hood is talented with firearms and various methods of criminal enterprise. He has access to dual HYDRA/A.I.M. technologies. Robbins seems to retain some knowledge of the occult, having re-established his magical abilities via contract with another demon.

He also retained a magical cloak, alongside some mystical abilities, such as teleportation and invisibility. He also has the ability to channel magic through his guns; however, he only uses them as a focus. This is demonstrated when he told a team of heroes that he'd battled that the pistols were merely for show, at which point he made a gun-pointing gesture with his fingers and blew up a floor on his penthouse condo.

He had somehow reacquired access to the Norn Stones as well, having used one to resurrect Hammerhead after he was fatally shot through the skull using unknown weaponry.

Previous Dormammu-related powers
The mystical boots and cloak Parker wears give him superhuman abilities. When wearing the boots, the Hood can walk on air. While wearing the cloak and holding his breath, he becomes invisible.

Robbins also finds that he can use the cloak to see past the illusion protecting Doctor Strange's headquarters. During the Skrull Invasion, it is revealed that Parker can detect Skrulls using an enhanced disguise that fools even the likes of Doctor Strange and Professor X.

Robbins also has the ability to transform demonically when under duress, gaining physical strength and speed to match Wolverine in one-on-one combat. In this demon form, his voice changes and he can sprout spikes from his hands. At least once, this allows Robbins to fire electrical energy from his hands. According to Doctor Strange, Robbins' powers will eventually kill him as the Nisanti consumes his mind, body, and soul. It was revealed that the Hood's mystical powers come from Dormammu which even enables him to resurrect the dead.

A recent exorcism appears to have removed the Hood from Robbins along with its mystical abilities.

Previous use of the Norn Stones
With Loki's help, the Hood acquired the Stones of Norn. According to Loki, they have the power to make him anything he wants to be. Parker has used them to beef up his weapons and gain powers to replicate those given by his possession by Dormammu. They have also been shown to power up anyone he desires. The removal of these powers appears to cause harm to those who have been empowered. The Norn Stones also show the ability, similar to Thor's Hammer, impossible to lift by anyone other than the chosen bearer. The Hood lost the powers of the Norn Stones when Loki retook possession of them to empower the heroes in their attack on the Sentry.

Previous Infinity Gem powers
The Hood had demonstrated various abilities through use of the Infinity Gems.

 The Yellow Gem of Reality allowed him to fulfill his wishes by distorting reality (such as turning the floor of the Baxter Building to water to dispatch Thing and to heal the facial scarring of Madame Masque) to his whims.
 The Blue Gem of Mind endowed him with vast psychic powers, giving sufficient telepathy with which to beat Professor X in mental combat.
 The Purple Gem of Space allowed him to exist at will at any place, or all places, and to teleport people or objects to locations across the universe, as seen when he teleports to an ocean side beach.
 The Red Gem of Power formerly gave him access to every form of energy and power, which can be channeled through his body to provide sufficient superhuman physicality to easily subdue Red Hulk with his fists.
 He also used the gems he has to sense the location of other Infinity Gems.

While observing the Hood's actions, Uatu the Watcher noted that the Hood's ability to use the Gems, while impressive, was still limited because he simply thought about using the Gems to enhance his own power rather than really thinking about what he could do with them, to the point of engaging his enemies in direct combat when he could simply will them out of existence.

Members of The Hood's Crime Syndicate
The Hood himself has answered to either the mystical entity Dormammu or the Asgardian Loki. Among the members of Hood's Crime Syndicate (sorted into parts of the Crime Syndicate) are:

Scientists:
 Answer (Aaron Nicholson)
 Centurius
 Chemistro (Calvin Carr)
 Controller
 Doctor Demonicus
 Jonas Harrow
 Microchip
 Thunderball (of the Wrecking Crew)
 Wizard

Criminal masterminds:
 Crimson Cowl
 Crossfire
 Deathwatch
 Jigsaw
 Madame Masque
 Masked Marauder
 Rampage
 Slug
 Wrecker (of the Wrecking Crew)

Elementals:
 Cyclone (André Gerard)
 Hydro-Man
 Vapor (of the U-Foes)

Energy manipulators:
 Basilisk (Basil Elks)
 Blackout (Marcus Daniels)
 Electro
 Firebrand (Gary Gilbert)
 Graviton
 Lightmaster
 Living Laser
 Megatak
 Nitro
 Scorcher
 Shocker
 Sunstroke
 Vector (of the U-Foes)
 X-Ray (of the U-Foes)

Magicians:
 Black Talon (Samuel Barone)
 Brothers Grimm (Percy and Barton Grimes; of Night Shift)
 Centurious

Mind manipulators:
 Black Abbott
 Corruptor
 Dansen Macabre (of Night Shift)
 Mandrill
 Mentallo
 Mind-Wave
 Miracle Man
 Mirage (Desmond Charne)
 Mister Fear (Alan Fagan)
 Purple Man
 Scarecrow
 Wraith (Brian DeWolff)

Strongmen:
 Armadillo
 Blood Brothers
 Crusader (Arthur Blackwood)
 Digger (Roderick Krupp; of Night Shift)
 Grey Gargoyle
 Griffin
 Grizzly (Maxwell Markham)
 Ironclad (of the U-Foes)
 Lascivious
 Letha
 Mister Hyde
 Ox (of the Enforcers)
 Tiger Shark
 Tombstone
 Wrecking Crew
 Bulldozer
 Piledriver

Speedsters:
 Blue Streak (Don Thompson)
 Cheetah
 Speed Demon

Spies or assassins:
 Blackout (Half-Demon version)
 Bloodshed
 Bushwacker
 Cutthroat
 Death Adder (Roland Burroughs)
 Deathlok (Luther Manning)
 Foolkiller (Kurt Gerhardt)
 Knickknack
 Needle (of Night Shift)
 Razor Fist (William Scott)
 Shockwave
 Spot (a mole for Mister Negative)
 Vermin
 White Dragon II
 White Rabbit

Others:
 Bird-Man (Achille DiBacco)
 Constrictor II
 Clown II
 Enforcers
 Fancy Dan
 Montana
 Hijacker
 Human Cannonball
 Human Fly (Richard Deacon)
 John King
 Man-Fish
 Night Shift
 Tatterdemalion
 Squid (Don Callahan)
 Turk Barrett
 Turner D. Century

Notably, some of the members of this syndicate later become members of MODOK's 11, including Mentallo and Living Laser, who are both thought to be killed in action while on that team. Within that series, a small amount of the Hood's influence is displayed in the Purple Man using the money he has been given, along with his powers, to take over a large casino, where he attempts to subdue Mentallo, possibly on the Hood's behalf. Since the end of the series, Living Laser has developed himself into a more complex being of energy (though he later joins the Initiative, which is now mostly just an extension of Hood's Gang posing as heroes). Armadillo departs from supervillainy to aid Deadly Nightshade in clearing the name of their friend, the Puma.

Reception
 In 2020, CBR.com ranked The Hood 3rd in their "Marvel: 10 Famous Villains From The 2000s To Bring Back" list.

Other versions

House of M: Masters of Evil
In the House of M reality, Hood assembles a group of villains to form the Masters of Evil in defiance to Magneto. It consists of Absorbing Man, Batroc the Leaper, Blizzard, Chemistro, Cobra, Constrictor, Crossbones, Madame Masque, Mister Hyde, Nitro, Sandman, Titania, Wizard, and the Wrecking Crew (Bulldozer, Piledriver, Thunderball, and Wrecker). The Hood and his Masters of Evil later fight the Red Guard. Hood tells the rest of the Masters of Evil that they will be going to the Central American country of Santo Rico to "liberate it." After putting El Toro (the former dictator) out of his misery, the Hood manages to kill the current dictators Madison Jeffries and Lionel Jeffries (who managed to kill Bulldozer and Piledriver) before taking over Santo Rico. The Hood's (and the teams') villainous past are revealed by Magneto and Sebastian Shaw, causing half of the team (consisting of Cobra, Crossbones, Mister Hyde, Chemistro, Wizard, and Thunderball) to leave Santo Rico, while the remaining members join the Hood to stand against the House of M's action. The Red Guard are sent there and massacre the Hood and the remaining villains in his group (except Titania who is thrown to safety by Absorbing Man). In this reality, the demon that the Hood's powers derived from has no resemblance to Dormammu.

Collected editions

In other media

Television
 The Hood appears in Marvel Future Avengers, voiced by Masakazu Nishida in the Japanese version and Todd Haberkorn in the English dub.
 The Hood will appear in Ironheart, portrayed by Anthony Ramos.

Video games
 The Hood appears in Marvel: Avengers Alliance.
 The Hood appears in Marvel Heroes, voiced by David Boat.
 The Hood appears in Marvel Puzzle Quest.
 The Hood appears as a playable character in Marvel: Contest of Champions.

References

External links
 Hood at Marvel.com
 Hood at Marvel Wiki
 Hood at Comic Vine
 Marvel Handbook Appendix entry

Marvel Comics characters who use magic
Marvel Comics demons
Marvel Comics male supervillains
Marvel Comics supervillains
Comics characters introduced in 2002
Fictional characters with death or rebirth abilities
Fictional crime bosses
Characters created by Kyle Hotz
Characters created by Brian K. Vaughan
Punisher characters
Spider-Man characters
Marvel Comics characters who can teleport
Fictional characters who can turn invisible